The South Patten River is a tributary of the Patten River, flowing in Cochrane District, in Northeastern Ontario, in Canada. The “South Patten River” flows in townships of Hepburn and Adair.

Geography 
The neighboring hydrographic slopes of the “South Patten River” are:
North side: Patten River, Turgeon River (Ontario and Quebec);
East side: Turgeon River (Ontario and Quebec), Boivin River (Quebec);
South side: Chaboillez River, La Reine River (Abitibi Lake) (Quebec and Ontario);
West side: Kabika River, East Kabika River, Case River.

The main source of the “South Patten River” is a creek. This source is located at:
 West of Ontario - Quebec border;
 North of the mouth of “South Patten River”;
 North of the North-West Bay of Abitibi Lake.

 to South-East, up to a creek (coming from South);
 to North, then Nord-East, passing on the North-West side of a mountain (summit of ), up to a creek (coming from South);
 to the North, snaking up to the mouth of the river.

The mouth of the Patten River empties on the West shore of Patten River. This mouth of the river is located in forest area at:
 west of Ontario - Quebec border;
 south of the mouth of the Patten River;
 southwest of the mouth of Turgeon River (confluence with Harricana River;
 North of the North-West Bay of Abitibi Lake.

Toponymy 
The term "Patten" refers to a family name of English origin.

See also 

Patten River, a watercouse
Turgeon River, a watercouse
Harricana River, a watercouse
James Bay
Cochrane District (Ontario)
List of rivers of Ontario

References

External links 

Patten